Nemirovich-Danchenko may refer to:

People
Vladimir Nemirovich-Danchenko (1858–1943), Russian playwright and theatre director
 Vasily Nemirovich-Danchenko (1845–1936), Russian novelist and journalist, Vladimir Nemirovich-Danchenko's brother

Ships
, a coaster in service 1946-71